Dylan Vente (born 9 May 1999) is a Dutch professional footballer who plays as a forward for Eerste Divisie club Roda JC.

Club career

Feyenoord
Vente started his career with VV Smitshoek in Barendrecht. At the age of nine, he joined Feyenoord's youth academy. He signed his first professional contract in November 2015.

From the 2017–18 season, Vente became part of their first team. He made his official debut on 13 September 2017 in an UEFA Champions League home match against Manchester City, coming off the bench for Michiel Kramer in the 72nd minute.

Vente made his Eredivisie debut for Feyenoord on 17 September 2017 in a game against PSV. He scored his first goal on 17 December 2017 in a 7–0 win against Sparta Rotterdam, almost a carbon copy of his great-uncle Leen Vente's goal against Beerschot in 1937, which was the first ever goal in Feyenoord's home ground, De Kuip.

Loan to RKC
On 23 August 2019, Vente joined newly promoted Eredivisie club RKC Waalwijk on loan until the end of the 2019–20 season. He made his RKC debut on 25 August 2019, replacing Paul Quasten in the 79th minute of a 3–0 loss to ADO Den Haag. Vente made only 18 appearance for the club, as he struggled with injuries. The season ended prematurely due to the COVID-19 pandemic.

Return to Feyenoord
At the beginning of the 2020–21 season, Vente was permanently placed in Feyenoord's under-21 team, and was given jersey number 58. In November 2020, however, Vente was mainly a part of the first-team squad, making his return to the pitch for Feyenoord on 23 December 2020, replacing Luciano Narsingh in the 78th minute of a 3–0 home win over Heerenveen.

Roda JC
On 28 January 2021, he moved to Roda JC on loan, who competed in the second-tier Eerste Divisie. He made his Roda debut on 30 January 2021, coming off the bench for Fabian Serrarens in the 75th minute of a 5–0 away victory against Dordrecht. On 15 February 2021, Vente scored his first goal for the club in a 3–1 win over Excelsior. During his six-month loan stint, he made 17 appearances in which he scored five goals.

On 4 August 2021, Vente signed a permanent deal until 2023 with Roda JC. He quickly grew into an undisputed starter for the club, and a proven goalscorer. On 3 December 2021, Vente scored his first hat-trick in a 5–2 league win over Dordrecht. He also scored a hat-trick in the return game against Dordrecht on 4 March 2022, heavily contributing to a 4–0 home win. Vente finished the 2021–22 season with 25 goals and seven assists in 42 total appearances for Roda, finishing fourth among Eerste Divisie top goalscorers.

Personal life
Vente is the great-nephew of former Feyenoord legend Leen Vente, who scored 65 goals in 82 appearances for the club between 1936 and 1941.

In February 2023, Vente and Roda JC teammate Guus Joppen were involved in a scuffle at a night club in Heerlen during Carnival celebrations, which left both with injuries. A man was later arrested, who had attacked Joppen and Vente.

Career statistics

Honours
Feyenoord
 KNVB Cup: 2017–18
 Johan Cruijff Shield: 2017, 2018

References

External links
 
 

Living people
1999 births
Footballers from Rotterdam
Association football forwards
Dutch footballers
Netherlands youth international footballers
VV Smitshoek players
Feyenoord players
RKC Waalwijk players
Roda JC Kerkrade players
Eredivisie players
Eerste Divisie players